Expedition 67 was the 67th long-duration expedition to the International Space Station. The expedition began upon the departure of Soyuz MS-19 on 30 March 2022, with NASA astronaut Thomas Marshburn taking over as ISS commander. Initially, the expedition consisted of Marshburn and his three SpaceX Crew-3 crewmates Raja Chari, Kayla Barron and Matthias Maurer, as well as Roscosmos cosmonauts Oleg Artemyev, Denis Matveev and Sergey Korsakov, who launched aboard Soyuz MS-21 on March 18, 2022 and transferred from Expedition 66 alongside the Crew-3 astronauts. However, continued international collaboration has been thrown into doubt by the 2022 Russian invasion of Ukraine and related sanctions on Russia. 

During Expedition 67, the space station was also visited by the crew of Axiom Mission 1, a space tourist mission that brought three spaceflight participants to the station on April 9, 2022 along with former NASA astronaut Michael López-Alegría, who had previously commanded the station during Expedition 14. They departed the ISS on April 25, 2022. 

Crew-3 departed on May 5, 2022, and was replaced by SpaceX Crew-4, which ferried NASA astronauts Kjell N. Lindgren, Bob Hines and Jessica Watkins, as well as ESA astronaut Samantha Cristoforetti, to the station. Before departing, Marshburn handed command of the station over to Artemyev.

Crew

Notes

References 

Expeditions to the International Space Station
2022 in spaceflight